The BOttle MAnnequin ABsorber phantom was developed by Bush in 1949 (Bush 1949) and has since been accepted in North America as the industry standard (ANSI 1995) for calibrating whole body counting systems.

The phantom consists of 10 polyethylene bottles, either cylinders or elliptical cylinders, that represent the head, neck chest, abdomen, thighs, calves, and arms.  Each section is filled with a radioactive solution, in water, that has the amount of radioactivity proportional to the volume of each section.  This simulates a homogeneous distribution of material throughout the body.  The solution will also be acidified and contain stable element carrier so that the radioactivity does not plate out on the container walls.

The phantom, which contains a known amount of radioactivity can be used to calibrate the whole body counter by relating the observed response to the known amount of radioactivity.  As different radioactive materials emit different energies of gamma photons, the calibration has to be repeated to cover the expected energy range: usually 120 to 2,000 keV.

Examples of radioactive isotopes that are used for efficiency calibration include 57Co, 60Co, 88Y, 137Cs and 152Eu.

Although the phantom was designed to be used lying down, it is used in any orientation.

Other uses

Performance testing: BOMAB phantoms are sometimes used by performance testing organizations to test operating assay facilities.  Phantoms, containing known quantities of radioactive material, are sent to assay facilities as blind samples.

Design characteristics:  Phantoms can be used to evaluate the relative effect of size, shape and positioning on the performance of in vivo measurement equipment.

Background:  A water filled BOMAB is often used to estimate the (blank) background for in vivo assay systems.

Detection Limits: A BOMAB filled with approximately 140 g of K-40, which is the nominal content in a 70 kg man, is sometimes used to estimate detection sensitivity of in vivo personnel counting systems.

See also
Computational human phantom
Imaging phantom

References

External links

Bush F. The integral dose received from a uniformly distributed radioactive isotope. British J Radiol. 22:96-102; 1949.

Health Physics Society. Specifications for the Bottle Manikin Absorber Phantom. An American National Standard. New York: American National Standards Institute; ANSI/HPS N13.35; 1995.

Radiobiology